Cryptosepalum tetraphyllum is a species of plant in the family Fabaceae. It is found in Ivory Coast, Ghana, Guinea, Liberia, and Sierra Leone. It is threatened by habitat loss.

References

External links
 

tetraphyllum
Flora of West Tropical Africa
Vulnerable plants
Taxonomy articles created by Polbot